Deborah J. Curtis is the twelfth and current President of Indiana State University.  The first woman to hold that position, she has been president since 2018, and her contract was recently extended until 2025.

Before her tenure at ISU, Curtis was the University of Central Missouri‘s provost and chief learning officer.  She had been provost since 2012.

Curtis graduated from ISU, receiving her Ph.D. in instruction and curriculum there. Her bachelor’s in music education is from MacMurray College, and her master’s, also in music education, is from the University of Illinois.

References

Living people
Year of birth missing (living people)
Place of birth missing (living people)
Nationality missing
Indiana State University people
University of Central Missouri faculty
Indiana State University alumni
MacMurray College alumni
University of Illinois Chicago alumni
Women heads of universities and colleges
Heads of universities and colleges in the United States